Crime Story (also known as New Police Story; released in the Philippines as Police Dragon) is a 1993 Hong Kong action crime thriller film, directed by Kirk Wong, and starring Jackie Chan, Kent Cheng, Law Kar-ying and Puishan Au-yeung. The film was released in Hong Kong on 24 June 1993.

Unlike most Jackie Chan films, which feature a combination of action and comedy, Crime Story is mostly a serious film. The film is based on actual events surrounding the 1990 kidnapping of Chinese businessman Teddy Wang.

Plot
Inspector Eddie Chan of the Organised Crime and Triad Bureau, who suffers from emotional stress after shooting several men in self-defense, is assigned to track down the kidnapped businessman Wong Yat-fei. The search takes him from Hong Kong to Taiwan, causing him to cross paths with some powerful mobsters. What complicates matters is that one of the kidnappers is operating within the police force, determined to stop Chan from succeeding. The relentlessly driven Chan finds himself fighting his personal demons at the same time he battles the seemingly unending wave of crime in the city.

Cast
Jackie Chan as Inspector Eddie Chan
Kent Cheng as Detective Hung Ting-bong
Law Kar-ying as Wong Yat-fei
Puishan Au-yeung as Wong Yat-fei's wife
Blackie Ko as Captain Ko
Pan Lingling as Psychiatrist
Christine Ng as Lara
Chung Fat as Ng Kwok-wah
Ken Lo as Ng Kwok-yan
Wan Fat as Simon Ting
William Tuan as Superintendent Cheung
Wan Seung-lam as Yen Chi-sheng
Mars as bank robber (uncredited)
Chan Tat-kwong as bank robber (uncredited)
Johnny Cheung as Black Dog
Wong Chi-wai as Black Dragon (uncredited)
James Ha as kidnapper / Ting-bong's henchman
Yu Kwok-lok as kidnapper
Wong Yiu as kidnapper
Rocky Lai as Taiwanese gangster / restaurant owner
Jameson Lam as policeman at construction site
Leung Gam-san as data centre manager

Production
According to the book I Am Jackie Chan: My Life in Action, written by Jackie Chan, Chan's legs were crushed after getting caught between two cars while filming the opening action scene.

The film is set and was filmed in Hong Kong and Taiwan in 42 days from 9 July to 20 August 1992. The climactic scene, in which a building is decimated by explosions, was filmed in the deserted Kowloon Walled City, which was scheduled for destruction at that time.

Jet Li was originally considered to play the role of Inspector Eddie Chan. Eventually, Jackie Chan was interested in the role of Inspector Eddie Chan, and he got it.

Release
Crime Story was released in Hong Kong on 24 June 1993. In the Philippines, the film was released as Police Dragon by Moviestars Production on 19 January 1994.

After the success of Rumble In The Bronx, Miramax wanted to release Crime Story next in theaters, until Jackie Chan advised against it, so Miramax released Police Story 3: Supercop (1992) instead.
The version was released on video and DVD on 18 July 2000 in the United States by Miramax was dubbed in English, although unlike most releases, it contained the original musical score. Chan's character had the name "Eddie" replaced with "Jackie" in the dub. There were four cuts made from the Miramax version:
The pre-credits sequence with the kidnappers was removed.
A scene where Wong is dumped overboard.
The last scene, Wong Yat-fei's wife tells him to thank Inspector Chan.
The last scene again where Chan burns Wong's wallet.

The Dragon Dynasty (DD) version has the original Cantonese track and also restored the cuts made in the Miramax version. It was released in 2007 and is about 107 minutes long. It also contains other deleted scenes not seen in either of the previous versions.

Dragon Dynasty released a DVD in the United States on 7 August 2007. On 15 January 2013, Shout! Factory released a DVD and Blu-ray as part of a double feature along with The Protector.

Box office 
In Hong Kong, the film grossed HK$27,439,331 at the box office. In Taiwan, it grossed NT$24,851,480 (US$941,994).  In Japan, it grossed  at the box office. In South Korea, it grossed . In the United States, the film grossed $194,720. This adds up to  grossed in Asia.

Reception
The film holds a 94% approval rating on Rotten Tomatoes based on 15 reviews; the average rating is 6.6/10. Kevin Thomas of the Los Angeles Times called the film "as fast and furious as action pictures get" while praising Chan's dramatic performance. Derek Elley of Variety said that it is stylish and fresh, but Chan "still needs more time with his drama coach". Bill Gibron of Popmatters called it "one of [Chan's] most serious and solidly suspenseful" films. Gibron says the film makes up for its lack of signature acrobatics with "one amazing setpiece after another" during the climax.

Stephen Hunter of The Baltimore Sun included it in 10th place at his year-end list of the best films. At the 1993 Golden Horse Awards, the film won Best Actor (Jackie Chan). At the 13th Hong Kong Film Awards, it won Best Film Editing (Peter Cheung) and was nominated for Best Action Choreography (Jackie Chan), Best Actor (Jackie Chan), Best Director (Kirk Wong), Best Picture, and Best Supporting Actor (Kent Cheng).

See also
Jackie Chan filmography
List of Hong Kong films of 1993
List of Hong Kong films

References

External links

1993 films
1993 martial arts films
1990s police procedural films
1993 action thriller films
1993 crime thriller films
1990s Cantonese-language films
Action films based on actual events
Films set in Hong Kong
Films set in Taiwan
Films shot in Hong Kong
Films shot in Taiwan
Golden Harvest films
Hong Kong action thriller films
Hong Kong crime thriller films
Hong Kong martial arts films
Media Asia films
Police detective films
Police Story (film series)
Triad films
Films about kidnapping
1990s Hong Kong films